is a Japanese rock band currently signed to Warner Bros. Home Entertainment and NBCUniversal Entertainment Japan. Beginning in 2004 as a one-man unit covering songs from different series, more members joined in 2007, and in 2010 the band made their major debut with the single "Highschool of the Dead", used as the opening theme of the 2010 anime television series Highschool of the Dead.

Overview

The band began in 2004 as a one-man dōjin music unit consisting of musician Kishida Kyoudan, who covered songs from different series, such as Touhou Project and video games by Key. He released a CD featuring original songs and covers of songs from Type-Moon games and Touhou Project at Winter Comiket in 2005. Vocalist Ichigo joined in 2007.

The band made their major debut in 2010 with the release of the single "Highschool of the Dead" under Geneon Universal (now NBCUniversal Entertainment Japan); the title song is used as the opening theme to the 2010 anime television series Highschool of the Dead. The band released its second single "Strike the Blood" on October 30, 2013 under Warner Bros. Home Entertainment; the title song is used as the first opening theme to the 2013 anime television series Strike the Blood. They released their third single  on July 29, 2015; the title song is used as the opening theme to the 2015 anime television series Gate. They released their fourth single  on January 27, 2016; the title song is used as the opening theme to the second season of Gate. They released their fifth single "Tenkyou no Alderamin" on July 20, 2016; the title song is used as the opening theme of the 2016 animated television series Alderamin on the Sky. They released their sixth single "Blood on the EDGE" on December 26, 2016; the title song is used as the opening theme of the 2016 animated OVA series Strike the Blood II. Their seventh single, "Stray," was released on February 7, 2018, and is used as the opening theme for the animated series Hakata Tonkotsu Ramens. Their eighth single, "Sirius," was released on August 22, 2018, and is used as the opening theme for the animated series Sirius the Jaeger. Their ninth, and latest single, "nameless story," is the ending theme for A Certain Scientific Railgun T, the third season of the animated series A Certain Scientific Railgun. In October 2021, they released their first best-of album Isekaitensei Shitara Best Album Deshita which included all of their past singles, a reboot version of their major debut single Highschool of the Dead[2021] and some other songs from their Genon Universal Entertainment discography. In December 2021, they released their first live album Super Pro Max Ti which included 14 songs (live ver.) and a new song called TRIGGER. They will release the single  on November 30, 2022; the title song is used as the opening theme to the anime series Reincarnated as a Sword.

Discography

Singles

Digital Singles

Albums

Commercial Albums

Compilation Albums

Live Albums

Independent Albums

Touhou-based albums

Other appearances

References

External links
 
Geneon Universal profile 
Warner Bros. Home Entertainment profile 

Anime musical groups
Japanese rock music groups
Musical groups established in 2004
NBCUniversal Entertainment Japan artists
2004 establishments in Japan